John Kanaroski (born December 23, 1984) is a former professional Canadian football wide receiver. He was drafted by the Calgary Stampeders in the sixth round of the 2009 CFL Draft. He played CIS football for the Regina Rams.

External links
Calgary Stampeders bio

1984 births
Living people
Calgary Stampeders players
Canadian football wide receivers
Players of Canadian football from Alberta
Regina Rams players
Canadian football people from Calgary